The Bismarck-Mandan Pards  were a minor league baseball team based in Bismarck, North Dakota in partnership with neighboring Mandan, North Dakota. The Bismarck–Mandan Pards played as members of the Northern League from 1962 to 1964 and in 1966. Previous Bismarck minor league teams played as members of the 1922 Dakota League, 1923  North Dakota League and the Manitoba-Dakota League from 1955 to 1957. The Bismarck–Mandan Pards were a minor league affiliate of the Minnesota Twins from 1962 to 1964 and Houston Astros in 1966. Bismarck hosted home minor league games at the Bismarck Municipal Ballpark 

Baseball Hall of Fame member Ray Dandridge played for the 1955 Bismarck Barons and led the league in hits at age 41.

History
Bismarck hosted numerous semi-pro and local teams, beginning in the late 1800's and continuing through the 1930's. The Bismarck teams had much success and integrated rosters that included Baseball Hall of Fame member, Satchel Paige.

Dakota League (1922)
Minor league baseball began in Bismarck, North Dakota in 1922. The Valley City Hi–Liners of the Class D level Dakota League moved to Bismarck on August 3, 1922 with a 25–46 record. Playing the remainder of the season as the Bismarck Capitals at Bismarck Municipal Ballpark, the Valley City/Bismarck team ended the Dakota League season with an overall record of 30–64, eighth in the Dakota League. Charlie Boardman, Ernie Menne, J. H. Sampson and Lou Bachant were the managers of the team. J.H. Sampson was the team president. Sampson first hired Charlie Boardman as player/manager of the team. But, shortly after the 1922 season began, Boardman was picked up by the Kansas City Blues, and first–baseman Ernie Menne briefly became manager. Sampson himself was serving as the manager at the time of the move from Valley City, with Bachant, the team's catcher becoming the manager after the franchise moved to Bismarck.

North Dakota League (1923)
The 1923 Bismarck Capitals continued play as members of the Class D level North Dakota League. The Bismarck Capitals resigned Charlie Boardman early in the 1923 season. Boardman was ejected from the game in the seventh inning of his first start for Bismarck, the first game of a doubleheader. Ejected in the seventh inning for talking back to the umpire, Boardman was also fined $10.00. Bismarck officials immediately paid the fine. Boardman then started the second game of the doubleheader and pitched a shut out of the Jamestown Jimkotans. Later in the 1923 season, Boardman had a  9–4 pitching record and league-leading .364 batting average when Bismarck suspended him without pay for “indifferent playing in the field.” Bismarck then traded Boardman to the new Valley City franchise. The Bismarck Capitals completed the 1923 season with a record of 26–42, placing 4th in the North Dakota League, playing under managers Tom Shanley and Maurice McKnight. The four–team North Dakota League permanently folded after the 1923 season.

After semi–professional baseball was first played in Bismarck in 1889, various teams of semi–pro and amateur status continued play in the city. In the 1930's, Baseball Hall of Fame members Satchel Paige and Hilton Smith played for the Bismarck Churchills semi-pro team. Satchel Paige was a pitcher for Bismarck in both 1933 and 1935. Smith played for the 1935 team. The 1935 Bismarck won the National Semi-Professional Baseball Championship Tournament. Other players included Ted "Double Duty" Radcliffe, Quincy Trouppe, Barney Morris, and Chet Brewer. In 1936, without Paige, Radcliffe, and Brewer, Bismarck returned to the national championships. Smith won four games, but Bismarck failed to repeat as champions.

Manitoba-Dakota League (1955 to 1957)
In 1955, the Bismarck Barons began play as members of the Independent Manitoba-Dakota League. In their three seasons, the Barons won both a pennant and a league championship. The 1955 Barons finished 47–41, to win the Manitoba–Dakota League regular season pennant, 3.0 games ahead of the 2nd place Williston Oilers. In the Playoffs, the Dickinson Packers defeated Bismarck 4 games to 1. The team was Managed by Al Cihocki. Baseball Hall of Famer Ray Dandridge played for the Bismarck Barons in 1955, hitting .360 in 328 at–bats and leading the league with 118 hits at age 41.

The Bismarck Barons finished in 2nd place in 1956, with a 47–41 record, playing again under Manager Al Cihocki. Bismarck finished 1.0 games behind the Williston Oilers in the regular season standings and were defeated in the Manitoba–Dakota League playoffs by the Minot Mallards 4 games to 2.

In 1957, the Bismarck Barons finished 1st in the regular season with a 38–33 record to win a second Manitoba–Dakota League pennant. The 1957 Manager was Bill Hockenbury. Bismarck finished 1.0 games ahead of the 2nd place Minot Minors in the regular season. Bismarck then defeated Minot in a weather affected Playoffs to claim the championship. In the 1957 Playoff Finals, the Bismarck Barons led the Minot Mallards 2 games to 1, when Minot forfeited after rain cancelled two games. The Manitoba-Dakota League permanently folded after the 1957 season.

Bismarck attempted to join the Northern League in 1958, along with the Minot Mallards. The league was considering expanding to ten teams. But the eight–team league wasn't able to successfully create a nine–team schedule when the Wausau franchise folded, so Bismarck did not gain the franchise.

Northern League (1962 to 1964, 1966)
Minor league baseball returned to Bismarck, when the 1962 Bismarck–Mandan Pards franchise, in partnership with neighboring Mandan, North Dakota, finally became members of the Class C level Northern League as an affiliate of the Minnesota Twins and playing at Bismarck Municipal Ballpark in Bismarck. Jack Hoeven, the father of the current North Dakota governor, was named team president. The Pards ended the 1962 season with a record of 60–62, sixth in the six–team Northern League under Manager Vern Morgan, who began the first of his three-year tenure. The Pards had season home attendance of 37,786, an average of 619 per contest.

The Bismarck–Mandan Pards continued play in the 1963 Northern League, which was now designated as a Class A league. Jack Hoeven was replaced as team president by Roger Higgins, a radio and television sports director, who had played for the Bismarck Barons. The Pards finished with a 1963 regular season record of 56–63, 3rd in the Northern League, with Vern Morgan continuing as manager. Season attendance at Bismarck Municipal Ballpark was 31,769, an average of 534 per game.

Playing their third season under Vern Morgan, the Bismarck–Mandan Pards of the Northern League finished the 1964 season with a record of 39–80. The team was last in the six–team Northern League. The Pards drew a season attendance of 19,332. The franchise did not return to the Northern League in 1965, as the league reduced to four teams for the 1965 season.

The Bismarck–Mandan Pards returned to the Northern League in 1966 and played their final season. Bismarck-Mandan finished with a record of 16–47, placing 6th in the  Northern League standings. Tony Pacheco was the 1966 manager. The final home season attendance at Bismarck Municipal Ballpark was 6,988, an average of 222 per contest. The Bismarck–Mandan Pards franchise folded after the season.

The ballpark
Bismarck and Bismarck–Mandan minor league teams played home games at the Bismarck Municipal Ballpark. The ballpark reportedly had a capacity of 3,000 with dimensions (Left, Center, Right) of: 321–410–320. The ballpark was built in 1921. The original grandstand was reportedly destroyed by fire in 1971 and rebuilt. In 1992, Washington Street, which runs alongside the ballpark, was widened and as a result the ballfield was rotated, with a new concrete grandstand constructed. Still in use for baseball today by the Bismarck Larks, Bismarck Municipal Ballpark is located at 303 West Front Street, Bismarck, North Dakota.

Timeline

Year–by–year records

Notable alumni

Baseball Hall of Fame alumni
Ray Dandridge (1955) Inducted, 1971

Notable alumni
Charlie Boardman (1922, MGR, 1923)
Dave Boswell (1964)
Bill Cash (1955)
Al Cihocki (1955–1956, MGR)
Jerry Crider (1962)
Gary Gearhart (1955)
Wally Gilbert (1922)
Preston Gomez (1955)
Tom Griffin (1966)
Roric Harrison (1966)
Ken Heintzelman (1955)
Andy Kosco (1964)
Fred Lasher (1962, 1964)
Rudy May (1963) 1980 AL ERA Leader
Walter McCoy (1955)
John Michaelson (1922)
Vern Morgan (1962–1964, MGR)
Jim Ollom (1964)
Art Pennington (1955–1956)
Newt Randall (1923)
Rich Reese (1963)
Scipio Spinks (1966)
Fred Stanley (1966)
Otis Thornton (1966)
Wayne Twitchell (1966)
Fred Vaughn (1955)
Bob Watkins (1966)
Roy Weatherly (1955)

See also
Bismarck Barons players
Bismarck Capitals players
Bismarck-Mandan Pards

References

External links
Baseball Reference

Professional baseball teams in North Dakota
Defunct baseball teams in North Dakota
Baseball teams established in 1962
Baseball teams disestablished in 1966
Minnesota Twins minor league affiliates
Sports in Bismarck, North Dakota
Northern League (1902-71) baseball teams
Mandan, North Dakota
Houston Astros minor league affiliates
1962 establishments in North Dakota
1966 disestablishments in North Dakota
Baseball teams disestablished in 1964
Baseball teams established in 1966